Borken may refer to:
Borken, North Rhine-Westphalia
Borken (district), in North Rhine-Westphalia
Borken, Hesse